Red Light is the second studio album by Swedish rapper Bladee. It was released on 11 May 2018 by YEAR0001. The album was released to digital retailers and streaming services along with an announcement that Bladee would be performing his first major solo show at London's O2 Academy Islington the following week.

Red Light was released on vinyl on 26 May 2022.

Track listing

References 

2018 albums
Bladee albums
Year0001 albums